Jonathan James Maxted (born 26 October 1993) is an English professional footballer who plays as a goalkeeper for Northampton Town.

Early and personal life
Born in Tadcaster, North Yorkshire, Maxted grew up in Boston Spa. His uncle, Paul Maxted, also played as a goalkeeper for Guiseley.

Career
After playing with Collingham and Tadcaster Albion, Maxted joined Doncaster Rovers at the age of 15. While with Doncaster he spent loan spells at Goole and  Gainsborough Trinity. After leaving Doncaster he played for Hartlepool United, before moving to Forest Green Rovers in July 2015. He signed on loan for Guiseley in September 2016, making the move permanent in November 2016. In November 2017 his performances were credited with helping Guiseley reach the second round of the FA Cup for the first time in their history. He signed for Accrington Stanley in January 2018. He made his Accrington Stanley debut on 2 April 2018, keeping a clean sheet in a 1–0 home win against Notts County. He served as a deputy to Connor Ripley in the 2018–19 season.

After failing to agree a new contract with Accrington, it was confirmed on 28 June 2019 that he would join Exeter City on 1 July 2019. He was nominated for January 2020 EFL League Two player of the month after keeping four consecutive clean sheets in the league. On 29 June 2020 he played for Exeter City in the behind closed doors League Two play-off final because of the COVID-19 pandemic at Wembley Stadium, missing out on promotion to League One with a 4–0 defeat to Northampton Town.

On 12 May 2021 it was announced that he would leave Exeter at the end of the season, following the expiry of his contract. On 24 June 2021 it was announced that he would sign for Northampton Town.

References

1993 births
Living people
English footballers
Tadcaster Albion A.F.C. players
Doncaster Rovers F.C. players
Goole A.F.C. players
Gainsborough Trinity F.C. players
Hartlepool United F.C. players
Forest Green Rovers F.C. players
Guiseley A.F.C. players
Accrington Stanley F.C. players
Exeter City F.C. players
Northampton Town F.C. players
English Football League players
Association football goalkeepers
People from Boston Spa